Fort San Juan may refer to:

 Fort San Juan (Joara), established by Juan Pardo in 1567-8 as the earliest Spanish outpost in the interior of what is now North Carolina
 Fort San Juan (Nicaragua)
 Battle of Fort San Juan (1780), in which the fort in Nicaragua was contested
 San Juan de Ulúa, a fortress complex on an island overlooking Veracruz, Mexico
 Fortín San Juan de la Cruz (Fort Saint John of the Cross), or El Cañuelo, on Isla de Cabras, Puerto Rico
 San Juan del Bayou, a previous name of Spanish Fort, New Orleans